Open House with Gloria Hunniford was an afternoon television show, produced by Thames Television and broadcast on Channel 5 in the United Kingdom between 1998 and 2003. It was presented by Gloria Hunniford and focused on lifestyle, cookery, and human interest issues. It was broadcast five days a week from Monday to Friday.

The programme was one of Channel 5's earliest shows, attracting relatively strong ratings for Channel 5, with a regular audience of 900,000. However, despite its favourable ratings, it was announced in September 2002 that the show would be axed as part of a revamp of the channel's daytime schedule.

References

External links
 .

1998 British television series debuts
2003 British television series endings
Channel 5 (British TV channel) original programming
Television series by Fremantle (company)
Television shows produced by Thames Television